Amazons II is an anthology of fantasy stories, edited by Jessica Amanda Salmonson, with a cover by Michael Whelan. Following up her earlier anthology Amazons!, it consists, like its predecessor volume, of works featuring female protagonists by (mostly) female authors. It was first published in paperback by DAW Books in June 1982.

Summary
The book collects 12 short stories and novelettes by various fantasy authors, with an introduction by Salmonson.

Contents
"Introduction: Art, History and Amazons" (Jessica Amanda Salmonson)
"For a Daughter" (F. M. Busby)
"The Battle Crow's Daughter" (Gillian Fitzgerald)
"Southern Lights" (Tanith Lee)
"Zroya's Trizub" (Gordon Derevanchuk)
"The Robber Girl" (Phyllis Ann Karr)
"Lady of the Forest End" (Gaèl Baudino)
"The Ivory Comb" (Eleanor Arnason)
"The Borders of Sabazel" (Lillian Stewart Carl)
"Who Courts a Reluctant Maiden" (Ardath Mayhar)
"The Soul Slayer" (Lee Killough)
"Nightwork" (Jo Clayton)
"In the Lost Lands" (George R. R. Martin)

Awards
The collection placed nineteenth in the 1983 Locus Award poll for Best Anthology.

References

1982 anthologies
Fantasy anthologies
DAW Books books
Books with cover art by Michael Whelan